Gücüksu is a quarter of the town of Göksun, Kahramanmaraş Province, Turkey. Its population is 427 (2021). Most of the village inhabitants are of Chechen descent. The Chechen name of the village is Behli Oyl, after a respected inhabitant of the village when it was founded, a sheikh named Beyli.

References 

Villages in Kahramanmaraş Province